Isabelle Therese Gulldén (born 29 June 1989) is a Swedish handball player for Lugi HF and former national team player for the Swedish National Team.

Career
In 2008, 2012, and 2016 she was part of the Swedish team competing at the Summer Olympic Games.

In 2014, she ranked among the 150 greatest Swedish athletes of all time, list published by Dagens Nyheter. Gulldén was the only female handballer alongside legendary Mia Hermansson-Högdahl.

She was given the award of Cetățean de onoare ("Honorary Citizen") of the city of Bucharest in 2016.

She retired from the national team on 15 December 2020.

Achievements
European Championship:
Silver: 2010
Bronze: 2014
Swedish Elite League:
Gold: 2007, 2008, 2009, 2010
Danish League:
Gold: 2014
Danish Cup:
Gold: 2011, 2013
Romanian Liga Națională:
Gold: 2016, 2017, 2018
Romanian Cupa României:
Gold: 2016, 2017, 2018
French League:
Gold: 2021
French Cup:
Gold: 2021
EHF Champions League:
Gold: 2016, 2022
Silver: 2021
Bronze: 2017, 2018
EHF Cup Winners' Cup:
Gold: 2014
Silver: 2012
Norwegian League:
Winner: 2021/2022
Norwegian Cup:
Winner: 2021

Individual awards
Swedish Elitserien Young Player of the Season: 2008
EHF Cup Winners' Cup Top Scorer: 2014
Most Valuable Player of the European Championship: 2014
European Championship Top Scorer: 2014
EHF Champions League Top Scorer: 2016 
Romanian Liga Națională Best Foreign Player: 2015, 2016, 2017
Swedish Elite League Best Player of All Time
Swedish Female Handballer of the Year: 2012, 2014, 2017, 2018
 Handball-Planet.com All-Star Playmaker: 2016
 Handball-Planet.com Best Buy: 2015–16
 ProSport All-Star Centre Back of the Romanian Liga Națională: 2017, 2018

Personal life
She is the niece of Christer Gulldén, a famous Swedish Greco-Roman wrestler. Her father Peter also competed in wrestling. She is married to former handball goalkeeper, Linus Persson. Their son, Lias was born on 10 July 2019.

References

External links

1989 births
Living people
Handball players from Gothenburg
Swedish female handball players
Handball players at the 2008 Summer Olympics
Handball players at the 2012 Summer Olympics
Handball players at the 2016 Summer Olympics
Olympic handball players of Sweden
Expatriate handball players
Swedish expatriate sportspeople in Denmark
Swedish expatriate sportspeople in Romania
Swedish expatriate sportspeople in France
Swedish expatriate sportspeople in Norway
Viborg HK players
IK Sävehof players
Lugi HF players